Klimavičius is the masculine form of a Lithuanian family name. Its feminine forms in Lithuanian are: Klimavičienė (married woman or widow) and Klimavičiūtė (unmarried woman). It is the Lithuanized form of the East Slavic surname Klimovich.

The surname may refer to:
Arūnas Klimavičius - football player
Tadas Klimavičius - basketball player

Lithuanian-language surnames